Musical collective is a phrase used to describe a group of musicians in which membership is flexible and creative control is shared. The concept is distinct from that of a traditional band in that musical collectives allow for flexibility in their rosters, and members are free to rotate in and out of the line-up. Collectives may exist in almost any genre of music, although they have been especially prominent in indie rock and hip hop.
	 
A musical collective is distinct from a musicians collective, such as the London Musicians Collective, which is an organization with more general aims and larger membership.

Notable collectives 

Acappella
Alaclair Ensemble
Ambiances Magnetiques
AMM
Amon Düül I
Amungus
Animal Collective
Anticon
Arcade Fire
Archive
Architecture in Helsinki
Army of the Pharaohs
Arrogant Sons of Bitches
ASAP Mob
The Band
Bandits of the Acoustic Revolution
Bankroll Mafia
Black Hippy 
Black Mountain
Blocks Recording Club
Bomb the Music Industry!
Bran Van 3000
Brockhampton
Broken Social Scene
Bugz in the Attic
The Cake Sale
Cardboard City
Coast Contra
Cocaine 80s
The Choir Practice
Computer Music Center (Columbia)
Consolidated
Crack Cloud
Crass
The Damnwells
Dance Macabre
The Desert Sessions
Diggin' in the Crates Crew
Doomtree
Dufay Collective
Dungeon Family
Early Day Miners
The Elephant 6 Collective
Fence Collective
F-IRE Collective
Godspeed You! Black Emperor
Grateful Dead
Griselda
Gungor
The Hidden Cameras
Hello! Project
Henri Faberge and the Adorables
Hieroglyphics
Hillsong United
I'm from Barcelona
The Jewelled Antler Collective
Jungle
KMFDM
La Coka Nostra
Lansing-Dreiden
Les Légions Noires
Living Legends
Mo Thugs
The Mountain Goats
Native Tongues
The Mekons
The New Pornographers
No-Neck Blues Band
The Ocean
Odd Future
Ozomatli
Parliament-Funkadelic
PC Music
Piano Magic
The Polyphonic Spree
Pro Era
The Reindeer Section
San Francisco Tape Music Center
Rhythm&Truth
Sault
Screwed Up Click
Self Defense Family
Silk Road Project
SMTOWN
SOB X RBE 
Soul Assassins
Soul II Soul
Soulquarians
So Solid Crew
Spider Gang
Sunburned Hand of the Man
Swans
Sweatshop Union
Tanakh
Trummerflora
Un Drame Musical Instantane
Underground Resistance
Undertow Music
Vulfpeck
Willard Grant Conspiracy
Willkommen Collective
The World/Inferno Friendship Society
Wu-Tang Clan
Wu-Tang Killa Beez
Yamantaka // Sonic Titan
Zodiak Free Arts Lab (Berlin)
TeamSESH

See also
Collective
Artist collective
Leaderless resistance – Collectives often share the anarchic streak associated with such entities.

References